Kazimierz Chodziński (Casimir) (1861 – 1919 or 1921) was a Polish sculptor, and a student of Jan Matejko academy in Kraków. He sculpted over a hundred different statues in partitioned Poland, as well as some other European cities, such as Vienna. Around 1903-1910 he worked in the United States, where he designed, among others, the Tadeusz Kościuszko statue in Chicago in the Humboldt Park neighborhood and the General Casimir Pulaski statue in Washington, DC.

Biography
Kazimierz Chodziński was born in 1861 in Łańcut, partitioned Poland. His father was a painter. Chodziński worked as an artist, painting and sculpting, gathering resources that allowed him to enroll in Kraków School of Fine Arts in Austrian partition of Poland and study under the sculptor Walery Gadomski and the famous painter Jan Matejko. As a student, he won an art competition, sold his first serious work ("Egyptian Woman" ), and around 1881, obtained a government scholarship to study at the Academy of Fine Arts in Vienna under Edmund von Hellmer. He received a number of other awards and scholarships, finishing his studies in 1887.

Afterward he returned to Kraków, where he opened a studio specializing in sculptures for religious and monumental buildings. Later, he moved his studio to Warsaw (capital of the Congress Poland), due to better conditions for exporting his work.

Around 1903-1910 he worked in the United States, where he designed, among others, the Tadeusz Kościuszko statue in Chicago in the Humboldt Park there and the General Casimir Pulaski statue in Washington, DC.

Chodziński died in 1919 in Lviv (Lwów), then in the newly independent Second Polish Republic.

Selected works
Some of his most famous works include: "Egyptian Woman," "Old Man," "Boy," "Dancing Faun," "Joyous Life," "Lord of the World," "Czesnik and Regent," "Boy's Head," "Girl's Head," "Readying for the Ball," "Praying Prisoner".

References

1861 births
1921 deaths
20th-century Polish sculptors
Polish male sculptors
20th-century male artists
19th-century sculptors